Carcinarctia metamelaena is a moth of the family Erebidae. It was described by George Hampson in 1901. It is found in Kenya.

References

Endemic moths of Kenya
Spilosomina
Moths described in 1901
Moths of Africa